is a former Japanese football player. he is the current first-team coach J2 League club of JEF United Chiba.

Club statistics

References

External links

1981 births
Living people
Meiji University alumni
Association football people from Ibaraki Prefecture
Japanese footballers
J2 League players
Mito HollyHock players
Tochigi SC players
Association football defenders